Focus Sat is a direct broadcast satellite television platform owned by M7 Group (Canal+ Luxembourg S.a.r.l.), a subsidiary of Canal+ Group, in Romania.

At the beginning, Focus Sat Romania was owned by the majority shareholder Focus Sat Limited (British company) and several individual shareholders (Romanian businessmen): Valentin Ionescu (former regional director of AIG New Europe Fund, shareholder in Astral Telecom), Bogdan Drăgoi ( worked for Inquam UK Limited and representative of the shareholder in Telemobil SA and Cristinel Popa (founder of Eastern Space Systems, former shareholder of Uniplus Radio from 1997 to 2002.) At the time of the launch of Focus Sat, Cristinel Popa was president and CEO, Valentin Ionescu he was vice president of finance, Bogdan Drăgoi was vice president of development, Adrian Cojocaru, vice president of Customer Operations and Liviu Pop, technical vice president.

At the time of launch, the Focus Sat service was offered in the form of a reception-installation kit based on a service contract. The installation kit cost 799 lei + VAT. The kit contained an STB (Set Top Box - satellite receiver), a remote control, LNB, satellite dish and a smartcard for decrypting TV programs.

The company was founded in November 2004 by 3 business partners. Liberty Global (then UnitedGlobalCom) bought 50% of the shares on May 19, 2005, and then launched the service in Romania on July 5, 2005. On April 11, 2006 Focus Sat became a full subsidiary of Liberty Global.

Around December 2005 Focus Sat also provided satellite internet access and satellite telephony for a short period of time.

Focus Sat launched its satellite television service in Republic of Moldova in 2008, where it offered around 50 TV channels, including 7 from Moldova.
In 2014, due to service being unavailable and lack of customer service, the company was fined and banned from broadcasting in Moldova for six months. Focus Sat has not returned to Moldova since.

In February 2010, the American company Liberty Global International established the division for satellite television transmission for Central Europe, named UPC DTH based in Howlad, Luxembourg. This company manages operations in the Czech Republic and Slovakia, being present under the name Freesat, in Hungary under the name UPC Direct, and in Romania under the name Focus Sat.

Since December 2018, the Focus Sat company has been acquired by M7 Group Europe, a company based in Luxembourg. The company also owns the brands Skylink from the Czech Republic and Slovakia, Canal Digitaal from the Netherlands, Diveo from Germany, Télésat from France, TV Vlaanderen from Belgium, HD Austria from Austria and M7 Deutschland from Germany.

In the middle of 2019, the acquisition of Focus Sat by M7 Group (Canal + Luxembourg S.a.r.l.) is expected to be completed.

On May 2, 2019 M7 Group bought Liberty Global's UPC DTH, the company that runs satellite television services in Czech Republic, Hungary, Romania and Slovakia. M7 Group then became a subsidiary of Vivendi's Canal+ Group in May 2019.

At the end of May 2019, the company M7 Group Europe (Canal + Luxembourg S.a.r.l.) is acquired by Canal+, a subsidiary of the French press group Vivendi. The acquisition is subject to authorization by European regulators, with the final decision expected in September 2019.

Since September 24, 2019, Focus Sat is officially a member of M7 Group, Vivendi/Canal+ group. Also from this date, the site www.focussat.ro was relaunched, with the new visual identity.

Since July 2020, Canal+ is the legal entity under which Focus Sat operates in Romania.

History
Focus Sat is the first DTH operator on the Romanian telecommunications market. It was launched in November 2004, although it was officially launched in the spring of 2005. Since April 2006, the owner of Focus Sat is UPC Romania, a company belonging to the American group Liberty Global International (LGI), which offers cable and satellite television services. , internet and telephony in 13 countries, in over 20 million homes worldwide. The Liberty Global group, in addition to the UPC brand, also includes Unitymedia, Kabel BW, Telenet, VTR, Chellomedia (TV division), and the Liberty Global Ventures investment fund.

References

External links
Focus Sat

Direct broadcast satellite services
Television companies of Romania
Companies based in Bucharest
M7 Group